No Parole from Rock 'n' Roll is the first album by  American heavy metal band Alcatrazz led by veteran singer Graham Bonnet, released in 1983. It spent seven weeks on the Billboard 200 albums chart, peaking at No. 128.  The album precipitated guitarist's Yngwie Malmsteen solo career, and is most famous for the single "Island in the Sun".

Track listing
Side one
"Island in the Sun" (Yngwie Malmsteen, Jimmy Waldo, Graham Bonnet) - 3:55
"General Hospital" (Malmsteen, Waldo, Bonnet) - 4:49
"Jet to Jet" (Bonnet, Malmsteen) - 4:27
"Hiroshima Mon Amour" (Bonnet, Malmsteen) - 4:00
"Kree Nakoorie" (Malmsteen, Waldo, Bonnet) - 6:10

Side two
"Incubus" (Malmsteen) - 1:24 (instrumental)
"Too Young to Die, Too Drunk to Live" (Bonnet, Malmsteen) - 4:20
"Big Foot" (Bonnet, Malmsteen) - 4:06
"Starcarr Lane" (Malmsteen, Waldo, Bonnet) - 3:53
"Suffer Me" (Bonnet, Malmsteen) - 4:16

2011 & 2015 Reissue bonus tracks (instrumental demos)
"Island in the Sun" - 3:47
"General Hospital" - 4:10
"Jet to Jet" - 4:11
"Hiroshima Mon Amour" - 3:23
"Kree Nakoorie" - 5:18
"Incubus" - 1:43
"Too Young to Die, Too Drunk to Live" - 3:42
"Big Foot" - 3:54
"Starcarr Lane" - 4:29
"Suffer Me" - 3:25

Personnel
 Graham Bonnet – vocals
 Yngwie Malmsteen – guitar
 Jimmy Waldo – keyboards, backing vocals
 Gary Shea – bass, backing vocals
 Jan Uvena – drums, backing vocals

Production
 Dennis Mackay – producer, mixing
 Willie Harlen – engineer, mixing
Nick Newton – logo design
Bad Samuels – art direction
Mark Sokol – artwork
Andrew Trueman – management

References

1983 debut albums
Polydor Records albums
Alcatrazz albums